Rand is a surname. Notable people with the surname include:

Archie Rand (born 1949), American painter and muralist
Austin L. Rand (1905–1982), Canadian zoologist
Ayn Rand (1905–1982), Russian-American philosopher and author
Benjamin H. Rand (1827–1883), American physician
Dave Rand (born 1973), Welsh cyclist
Dick Rand (1936–1996), American baseball player
Edgar E. Rand (c. 1905-1955), American business executive.
Frank C. Rand (1876-1949), American businessman and philanthropist.
Gloria Rand, Canadian actor
Isaac Rand (1674–1743), English botanist and apothecary
Ivan Rand (1884–1969), Canadian lawyer and politician
Jack Rand (1902–1970), English football player
James Rand, Jr. (1886–1968), American industrialist
John G. Rand (1801–1873), American inventor of paint tube
John L. Rand (1861–1942), American politician and jurist
Johnathan Rand (born 1964; Christopher Wright), American children's writer
Keith Rand (born 1956), English sculptor
Kristjan Rand (born 1987), Estonian ice dancer
Leander Rand (1827–1900), Canadian politician
Mary Rand (born 1940), British track-and-field athlete
Nelson Rand, Canadian journalist
Paul Rand (1914–1996), American graphic designer
Philinda Rand (1876–1972), American English-language teacher in the Philippines
Reili Rand (born 1991), Estonian politician
Ripley Rand (born ca. 1970), American jurist
Rose Rand (1903–1980), Austrian-American logician and philosopher
Sally Rand (1904–1979), American burlesque dancer and film actress

Shuli Rand (born 1962), Israeli film actor
Sidney Rand (1916–2003), American diplomat
Sidney Rand (1934–2008), English rower
Silas Tertius Rand (1810–1889), Canadian clergyman, ethnologist, linguist and translator
Taavi Rand (born 1992), Estonian ice dancer
Ted Rand (1916–2005), American book illustrator
Theodore Harding Rand (1835–1900), Canadian educator and poet
Tom Rand (costume designer), British costume designer 
Tony Rand (1939-2020), American lawyer and politician
Tuuli Rand (born 1990), Estonian singer 
Tyler Rand (born 1991), American arts executive
Walter Rand, American politician
William Rand (fl. 1650–1660), English physician
William H. Rand (1828–1915), American publisher and businessman
William Rand (1886–1981), American hurdler
Yvonne Rand, American Zen Buddhist priest

Fictional characters:
Atton Rand, character from Star Wars: Knights of the Old Republic II
Janice Rand, character in the Star Trek universe
Iron Fist (comics) (Daniel Rand), a Marvel Comics character
Ben Rand, character from Being There (1979) performed by Melvyn Douglas

Estonian-language surnames